Fabian Pavone (born 5 February 2000) is an Italian football player. He plays for  club Fidelis Andria on loan from Parma.

Club career
He is a product of Pescara youth teams and made one bench appearance for the senior squad in April 2019.

On 29 June 2019, he signed a 5-year contract with Serie A club Parma. On 31 July 2019, Parma loaned him back to Pescara for the 2019–20 season.

He made his Serie B debut for Pescara on 29 October 2019 in a game against Juve Stabia. He substituted Luca Palmiero in the 75th minute.

On 8 September 2020 he went to Carrarese on loan.

On 18 July 2021 he joined Turris on loan. On 7 July 2022, Pavone moved on a new loan to Fidelis Andria.

References

External links
 

2000 births
Sportspeople from the Province of Teramo
Footballers from Abruzzo
Living people
Italian footballers
Association football forwards
Delfino Pescara 1936 players
Carrarese Calcio players
S.S. Turris Calcio players
S.S. Fidelis Andria 1928 players
Serie B players
Serie C players
21st-century Italian people